Captain Joseph Eskel Hallonquist (13 April 1895 - 22 August 1958) was a World War I flying ace credited with five aerial victories.

When World War I began, Hallonquist was chief clerk of a bank in British Columbia. He joined the 19th Reserve Battalion of the Canadian Expeditionary Force, only to transfer to the Royal Flying Corps. He trained with 26 and 73 Squadrons before being posted on 23 January 1918 to 28 Squadron in Italy as an Honorary Captain. He opened his victory roll on 17 April 1918. His fourth confirmed win on 13 July downed Austro-Hungarian ace Ferdinand Udvardy; although Hallonquist was credited with a destruction, Udvardy survived. On 29 October 1918, Hallonquist was shot down by anti-aircraft fire. He spent a short period as a prisoner of war before returning to Canada.

Sources of information

References
Above the Trenches: a Complete Record of the Fighter Aces and Units of the British Empire Air Forces 1915-1920. Christopher F. Shores, Norman L. R. Franks, Russell Guest. Grub Street, 1990. , .

1895 births
1958 deaths
Canadian World War I flying aces